In ancient Rome,  (from Greek  , "hot") and  (from Greek  ) were facilities for bathing.  usually refers to the large imperial bath complexes, while  were smaller-scale facilities, public or private, that existed in great numbers throughout Rome.

Most Roman cities had at least one – if not many – such buildings, which were centers not only for bathing, but socializing and reading as well. Bathhouses were also provided for wealthy private villas, town houses, and forts. They were supplied with water from an adjacent river or stream, or within cities by aqueduct. The water would be heated by fire then channelled into the caldarium (hot bathing room). The design of baths is discussed by Vitruvius in De architectura (V.10).

Terminology

The diminutive  is adopted by Seneca to designate the bathroom of Scipio in the villa at Liternum, and is expressly used to characterize the modesty of republican manners as compared with the luxury of his own times. Thus, Cicero terms the baths at the villa of his brother Quintus .

Writers, however, use these terms without distinction. Thus the baths erected by Claudius Etruscus, the freedman of the Emperor Claudius, are styled by Statius , and by Martial . In an epigram by Martial——the terms are not applied to the whole building, but to two different chambers in the same edifice.

Building layout

A public bath was built around three principal rooms: the tepidarium (warm room), the caldarium (hot room), and the frigidarium (cold room). Some  also featured steam baths: the sudatorium, a moist steam bath, and the laconicum, a dry hot room much like a modern sauna.

By way of illustration, this article will describe the layout of Pompeii's Old Baths, otherwise known as the Forum Baths, which are among the best-preserved Roman baths. These baths were connected to the forum at Pompeii, hence the name. The references are to the floor plan pictured to the right.

This specific complex consists of a double set of baths, one for men and one for women. It has six different entrances from the street, one of which (b) gives admission to the smaller women's set only. Five other entrances lead to the men's department, of which two (c and c2), communicate directly with the furnaces, and the other three (a3, a2, a) with the bathing apartments.

Palaestra
Passing through the principal entrance, a (barely visible, right side, one third of the total length from above), which is removed from the street by a narrow footway surrounding the building and after descending three steps, the bather would find a small chamber on his left (x) with a toilet (latrina), and proceed into a covered portico (g, g), which ran round three sides of an open court (palaestra, A). These together formed the vestibule of the baths, in which the servants waited.

Use of the palaestra
This palaestra was the exercise ground for the young men, or perhaps served as a promenade for visitors to the baths. Within this court the keeper of the baths, who exacted the quadrans paid by each visitor, was also stationed. The room (f) which runs back from the portico, might have been appropriated to him; but most probably it was an oecus or exedra, for the convenience of the better classes while awaiting the return of their acquaintances from the interior. In this court, advertisements for the theatre or other announcements of general interest were posted, one of which, announcing a gladiatorial show, still remains. At the sides of the entrance were seats.

The 1898 edition of Harper's Dictionary of Classical Antiquities provided illustrations envisioning the rooms of the Old Baths at Pompeii:

Apodyterium and frigidarium

A passage (c) leads into the apodyterium (B), a room for undressing in which all visitors must have met before entering the baths proper. Here, the bathers removed their clothing, which was taken in charge by slaves known as capsarii, notorious in ancient times for their dishonesty. The  was a spacious chamber, with stone seats along three sides of the wall (h). Holes are still visible on the walls, and probably mark the places where the pegs for the bathers' clothes were set. The chamber was lighted by a glass window, and had six doors. The bath in this chamber is of white marble, surrounded by two marble steps.

Tepidarium

It did not contain water either at Pompeii nor at the Baths of Hippias, but was merely heated with warm air of an agreeable temperature, in order to prepare the body for the great heat of the vapour and warm baths, and, upon returning, to prevent a too-sudden transition to the open air. The walls feature a number of separate compartments or recesses for receiving the garments when taken off. The compartments are divided from each other by figures of the kind called atlantes or telamones, which project from the walls and support a rich cornice above them in a wide arch.

Three bronze benches were also found in the room, which was heated as well by its contiguity to the hypocaust of the adjoining chamber, as by a brazier of bronze (foculus), in which the charcoal ashes were still remaining when the excavation was made. Sitting and perspiring beside such a brazier was called .

The  is generally the most highly ornamented room in baths. It was merely a room to sit and be anointed in. In the Forum Baths at Pompeii the floor is mosaic, the arched ceiling adorned with stucco and painting on a coloured ground, the walls red.

Anointing was performed by slaves called unctores and aliptae. It sometimes took place before going to the hot bath, and sometimes after the cold bath, before putting on the clothes, in order to check the perspiration. Some baths had a special room (destrictarium or unctorium) for this purpose.

Caldarium

Its walls also were hollow, behind the decorated plaster one part of the wall was made from interconnected hollow bricks called , forming a great flue filled with heated air. At one end was a round basin (labrum), and at the other a quadrangular bathing place, approached from the platform by steps. The  held cold water, for pouring upon the bather's head before he left the room.

Laconicum

Service areas

Of its two staircases, one leads to the roof of the baths, and one to the boilers containing the water.

There were three boilers, one of which  held the hot water; a second, the tepid; and the third, the cold. The warm water was filled into the warm bath by a pipe through the wall, marked on the plan. Underneath the hot chamber was set the circular furnace d, of more than 7 ft. in diameter, which heated the water and poured hot air into the hollow cells of the hypocaustum. It passed from the furnace under the first and last of the caldrons by two flues, which are marked on the plan. It was already considerably heated from its contiguity to the furnace and the hypocaust below it, so that it supplied the deficiency of the former without materially diminishing its temperature; and the vacuum in this last was again filled up from the farthest removed, which contained the cold water received directly from the square reservoir seen behind them. The boilers themselves no longer remain, but the impressions which they have left in the mortar in which they were embedded are clearly visible, and enable us to determine their respective positions and dimensions. Such coppers or boilers appear to have been called , from their similarity of shape to a milestone.

Behind the boilers, another corridor leads into the court or palaestra (K), appropriated to the servants of the bath.

Women's bath
The adjoining, smaller set of baths were assigned to the women. There are four steps on the inside to descend into it.

The floor of this chamber is suspended, and its walls perforated for flues, like the corresponding one in the men's baths. The  in the women's baths had no brazier, but it had a hanging or suspended floor.

Purpose

The baths often included, aside from the three main rooms listed above, a palaestra, or outdoor gymnasium where men would engage in various ball games and exercises. There, among other things, weights were lifted and the discus thrown. Men would oil themselves (as soap was still a luxury good and thus not widely available), shower, and remove the excess with a strigil (cf. the well known Apoxyomenus of Lysippus from the Vatican Museum).

The changing room was known as the apodyterium (from Greek  from  'to take off').

Cultural significance
In many ways, baths were the ancient Roman equivalent of community centres. Because the bathing process took so long, conversation was necessary. Many Romans would use the baths as a place to invite their friends to dinner parties, and many politicians would go to the baths to convince fellow Romans to join their causes. The  had many attributes in addition to the baths. There were libraries, rooms for poetry readings, and places to buy and eat food. The modern equivalent would be a combination of a library, art gallery, mall, restaurant, gym, and spa.

One important function of the baths in Roman society was their role as what we would consider a “branch library” today. Many in the general public did not have access to the grand libraries in Rome and so as a cultural institution the baths served as an important resource where the more common citizen could enjoy the luxury of books. The Baths of Trajan, of Caracalla, and Diocletian all contained rooms determined to be libraries. They have been identified through the architecture of the baths themselves. The presence of niches in the walls are assumed to have been bookcases and have been shown to be sufficiently deep to have contained ancient scrolls. There is little documentation from the writers of the time that there did exist definitive public libraries maintained in the baths, but records have been found that indicated a slave from the imperial household was labelled  ('maintenance man of the Greek library of the baths'). However, this may only indicate that the same slave held two positions in succession: "maintenance man of the baths" and "employee in the Greek library" (a ). The reason for this debate is that, although Julius Caesar and Asinius Pollio advocated for public access to books and that libraries be open to all readers, there is little evidence that public libraries existed in the modern sense as we know it. It is more likely that these reserves were maintained for the wealthy elite.

Baths were a site for important sculpture; among the well-known pieces recovered from the Baths of Caracalla are the Farnese Bull and Farnese Hercules and over life-size early 3rd century patriotic figures, (now in the Museo di Capodimonte, Naples).

The Romans believed that good health came from bathing, eating, massages, and exercise.  The baths, therefore, had all of these things in abundance.  Since some citizens would be bathing multiple times a week, Roman society was surprisingly clean. When asked by a foreigner why he bathed once a day, a Roman emperor is said to have replied "Because I do not have the time to bathe twice a day." Emperors often built baths to gain favour for themselves and to create a lasting monument of their generosity. If a rich Roman wished to gain the favour of the people, he might arrange for a free admission day in his name. For example, a senator hoping to become a Tribune might pay all admission fees at a particular bath on his birthday to become well known to the people of the area.

Location

Baths sprang up all over the empire. Where natural hot springs existed (as in Bath, England; Băile Herculane, Romania or Aquae Calidae near Burgas and Serdica, Bulgaria)  were built around them. Alternatively, a system of hypocausta (from  'below' and  'to burn') were utilised to heat the piped water from a furnace.

Remains of Roman public baths

A number of Roman public baths survive, either as ruins or in varying degrees of conservation. Among the more notable are the Roman baths of Bath and the Ravenglass Roman Bath House in England as well as the Baths of Caracalla, of Diocletian, of Titus, of Trajan in Rome and the baths of Sofia, Serdica and Varna.  Probably the most complete are various public and private baths in Pompeii and nearby sites. The Hammam Essalihine is still in use today.

In 1910, Pennsylvania Station was opened in New York City, with a Main Waiting Room that borrowed heavily from the frigidarium of the Baths of Diocletian, especially with the use of repeated groin vaults in the ceiling. The success of the design of Pennsylvania Station in turn was copied in other railroad stations around the world.

See also

 Ancient Roman bathing
 Diocletian window (thermal window)
 Greek baths
 History of sanitation
 Roman architecture
 Roman culture
 Roman engineering
 Roman technology
 Spa town
 Thermae Romae (manga and film)
 Turkish Bath
 Victorian Turkish bath

References

Citations

Sources

Further reading
Bruun, Christer. 1991. The water supply of ancient Rome: A study of Roman imperial administration. Helsinki: Societas Scientiarum Fennica.
DeLaine, Janet. 1997. The Baths of Caracalla: A Study In the Design, Construction, and Economics of Large-Scale Building Projects In Imperial Rome. Portsmouth, RI: Journal of Roman Archaeology.
DeLaine, Janet, and David E Johnston. 1999. Roman Baths and Bathing: Proceedings of the First International Conference On Roman Baths Held At Bath, England, 30 March-4 April 1992. Portsmouth, RI: Journal of Roman Archaeology.
Fagan, Garrett G. 2001. "The genesis of the Roman public bath: Recent approaches and future directions." American Journal of Archaeology 105, no. 3: 403–26.
Manderscheid, Hubertus. 2004. Ancient Baths and Bathing: A Bibliography for the Years 1988-2001. Portsmouth, RI: Journal of Roman Archaeology.
Marvin, M. 1983. "Freestanding sculptures from the Baths of Caracalla." American Journal of Archaeology 87: 347–84.
Nielsen, Inge. 1993. Thermae Et Balnea: The Architecture and Cultural History of Roman Public Baths. 2nd ed. Aarhus, Denmark: Aarhus University Press.
Ring, James W. 1996. "Windows, baths and solar energy in the Roman Empire." American Journal of Archaeology 100: 717–24.
Rotherham, Ian D. 2012. Roman Baths In Britain. Stroud: Amberley.
Roupas, N. 2012. "Roman bath tiles." Archaeology 65, no. 2: 12.
Yegül, Fikret K. 1992. Baths and bathing in classical antiquity. New York: Architectural History Foundation.
--. 2010. Bathing In the Roman World. New York: Cambridge University Press.

External links

William Smith Roman Baths (Balneae) from "A Dictionary of Greek and Roman Antiquities", pub. John Murray, London, 1875.
ThermeMuseum (Museum of the Thermae) in Heerlen
 Traianus – Technical investigation of Roman public works
Roman Bath: a day at the baths An interactive site using the Baths of Caracalla as an example
Barbara F. McManus Roman baths and bathing
3d reconstruction of a Roman baths Limes in Austria
Roman Baths of Weissenburg Digital Media Archive (creative commons-licensed photos, laser scans, panoramas) with data from a City of Weissenburg/CyArk research partnership
Victorian Turkish bath Information regarding a 19th-century version of the Roman or "Turkish" bath

Ancient Roman baths
Hydrotherapy